Bad Homburg Castle (Schloss Bad Homburg) is a castle and palace in the German city of Bad Homburg vor der Höhe. Originally the residence of the Landgraves of Hesse-Homburg, it was first built in the 12th century. All but the keep was demolished in 1660 by Frederick II, Landgrave of Hesse-Homburg. He replaced the old castle with a new one designed by Paul Andrich between 1680 and 1685. Its grounds and gardens were landscaped in the 18th and 19th centuries, including the addition of the Gothic House.

It was inherited by Hesse-Darmstadt after Prussia's annexation of Hesse-Homburg in 1866 following the Austro-Prussian War, becoming a summer residence for the kings of Prussia. William I stayed at the castle several times, as did his son and successor Frederick III and Frederick's wife Victoria. The castle was a particular favourite of Frederick and he and his successors added bathrooms, telephone rooms and electricity and merged some rooms. After 1918 the castle was administered by the Prussian state and from 1945 by the state of Hesse. From 1947 it housed the Verwaltung der Staatlichen Schlösser und Gärten Hessen (Hesse Administration for State Castles and Gardens).

Bibliography (in German)

 Heinz Biehn, Wolfgang Einsingbach: Amtlicher Führer Schloss Homburg vor der Höhe. Herausgegeben von Verwaltung der Staatlichen Schlösser und Gärten in Hessen.  Dt. Kunstverlag, München 1959
 Günther Binding: Beobachtungen und Grabungen im Schloss Bad Homburg vor der Höhe im Jahre 1962. In: Mitteilungen des Vereins für Geschichte und Landeskunde zu Bad Homburg vor der Höhe, Band 32 (1974)
 Rüdiger Kurth: Vielleicht ist er Kaiser Barbarossa begegnet. (W)Ortwin von Hohenberch und seine Burg, in: Jahrbuch des Hochtaunuskreises 2006. Frankfurt 2005, S. 94–98
 Friedrich Lotz: Geschichte der Stadt Bad Homburg vor der Höhe. 2 Bände:
 Band 1: Begegnung mit Urkunden. Kramer, Frankfurt 1964
 Band 2: Die Landgrafenzeit. Kramer, Frankfurt 1972, 
 Fried Lübbecke: Kleines Vaterland Homburg vor der Höhe. Frankfurt 1964
 Bernd Modrow, Claudia Gröschel: Fürstliches Vergnügen. 400 Jahre Gartenkultur in Hessen. Verlag Schnell + Steiner, Regensburg 2002, 
 Bernd Modrow: Schlosspark Homburg vor der Höhe. Vom Burggarten zum Schlosspark, Verlag Schnell + Steiner, Regensburg, 1. Auflage 2007, 
 Iris Reepen, Claudia Göschel: Landgräfin Elisabeth, ihre Wohnung in Schloss Homburg und ihre Gärten.  Verlag Ausbildung und Wissen, Bad Homburg 1998,

References

1680s architecture
Baroque architecture in Hesse
Buildings and structures in Bad Homburg vor der Höhe
Castles in Hesse
Royal residences in Hesse